Van Horn is a town in and the seat of Culberson County, Texas, United States. According to the 2010 census, Van Horn had a population of 2,063, down from 2,435 at the 2000 census. The 2020 census results detailed a decline in population to 1,941. Van Horn's official newspaper is The Van Horn Advocate. The town is the westernmost incorporated community in the United States that uses the Central Time Zone.

Geography
Van Horn is located in southwestern Culberson County at  (31.042489, –104.832928). Interstate 10 passes through the town, leading east  to Fort Stockton and northwest  to El Paso. Van Horn is the western terminus of U.S. Route 90; from Van Horn it leads southeast  to Marfa. Texas State Highway 54 leads north from Van Horn  to Pine Springs and the Guadalupe Mountains.

Threemile Peak, elevation , rises to the northwest overlooking the town.

Climate

History

Anglo-Texan settlement began in the late 1850s and early 1860s supportive of the San Antonio-El Paso Overland Mail route. Although U.S. Army Major Jefferson Van Horne is believed to have passed near the area in 1849 on his way to take command of what would later become Fort Bliss, the town is instead named for Lt. James Judson Van Horn who commanded an army garrison at the Van Horn Wells beginning in 1859. Lt. Van Horn's command was relatively short-lived, as the post was seized by Confederate forces in 1861 and Lt. Van Horn taken prisoner. Settlement was further stimulated by the construction of the Texas and Pacific Railway in 1881. The town has several buildings on the National Register of Historic Places including the First Presbyterian Church (now Primera Iglesia Bautista), built in 1901.

Demographics

2020 census

As of the 2020 United States census, there were 1,941 people, 607 households, and 339 families residing in the town.

2000 census
As of the census of 2000,  2,435 people, 834 households, and 652 families resided in the town. The population density was 846.9 people per square mile (326.4/km). The 976 housing units averaged 339.5 per square mile (130.8/km). The racial makeup of the town was 64.6% White, 0.7% African American, 0.6% Native American, 0.6% Asian, 31.5% from other races, and 2.1% from two or more races. Hispanics or Latinos of any race were 78.6% of the population.

Education

Van Horn is served by the Culberson County-Allamoore Independent School District and is home to the Van Horn High School Eagles.

Government and infrastructure

The United States Postal Service operates the Van Horn Post Office.

Transportation

Major highways

Rail
 Union Pacific Railroad

Bus
 Greyhound Lines stops at a Super 8 at the west end of Bus. I-10-D.

Space tourism
A 2006 article on Space.com reported that Blue Origin was expected to start commercial operations as early as 2010, aiming for 52 launches per year from the Van Horn facility.

In early 2010, NASA awarded Blue Origin US$3.7 million to work on an advanced technology, which detaches a crew cabin from its launcher if the shuttle malfunctions.

An August 2016 update reported Blue Origin was still conducting test flights with plans to begin flying piloted tests in 2017 and paying customers in 2018. Blue Origin's actual first human launch from, and return to, Van Horn occurred on the morning of July 20, 2021, with a crew of four people.

10,000-year clock
In 2009 the Van Horn Advocate announced that the Long Now Foundation was starting geologic testing for an underground space to house a 10,000-year Clock of the Long Now, on the Bezos ranch, north of Van Horn.

Popular culture
Van Horn provided the inspiration for the 2019 song "Van Horn" by alternative-rock band Saint Motel which was featured on their EP The Original Motion Picture Soundtrack: Part 1 after the band spent a night there on a recent tour.

Famed football coach John Madden put Chuy's Restaurant on the national map after a 1987 stop with his Madden Cruiser bus.

Gallery

See also

 Guadalupe Mountains National Park
 Guadalupe Mountains
 Kent, Texas
 McKittrick Canyon
 Sierra Blanca, Texas
 West Texas
 Beach Mountains

Notes

References

External links

 
 , local newspaper
 
  from the Clark Hotel Museum, hosted by the 
 

Towns in Culberson County, Texas
Towns in Texas
County seats in Texas